Mark Woodforde was the defending champion but lost in the first round to Jimmy Arias.

Thomas Muster won in the final 3–6, 6–2, 7–5 against Arias.

Seeds

  Sergi Bruguera (semifinals)
  Goran Ivanišević (first round)
  Thomas Muster (champion)
  Alexander Volkov (second round)
  Paul Annacone (second round)
  Mark Koevermans (quarterfinals)
  Michiel Schapers (second round)
  Marc Rosset (second round)

Draw

Finals

Top half

Bottom half

References
 1990 Australian Men's Hardcourt Championships Draw

Next Generation Adelaide International
Australian Men's Hardcourt Championships
1990 in Australian tennis